Arrien-en-Bethmale is a commune in the Ariège department in the Occitanie region of south-western France.

The inhabitants of the commune are known as Arrienois or Arrienoises

Geography
Arrien-en-Bethmale consists of the villages of Aret, Arrian, Tournac, and Villargein, all located in the Pyrenees mountains in the Bethmale valley in the former province of Couserans some 12 km south-west of Saint-Girons and 3 km south of Castillon-en-Couserans. It is part of the Regional Natural Park of Pyrenees Ariège. Access to the commune is by the D17 road from Les Bordes-sur-Lez in the north-west passing through the commune and the village and continuing south-east to Bethmale. The commune is a rugged alpine commune heavily forested in many parts.

The Ruisseau de Cournelliere and the De Leaude rise north-east of the village and flow down to the south-west to join the Balamet river which flows down the valley to join the Lez north-west of the commune just south of Les Bordes-sur-Lez. The Ruisseau de Mourtis flows through the south of the commune also into the Lez.

Neighbouring communes and villages

History
The commune was created in 1931 when it separated from the commune of Bethmale.

Arrien-en-Bethmale has a very ancient history, as evidenced by the discovery of a funerary inscription dating probably from the 1st century.

Administration

List of Successive Mayors

Demography
In 2017 the commune had 111 inhabitants.

Culture and heritage

Religious heritage
The Church contains several items that are registered as historical objects:
An Altar, Retable, Tabernacle, 3 Statues, and a Painting (18th century)
2 Candlesticks (18th century)
An Altar, Retable, Tabernacle, 2 Paintings, and 2 Bas-Reliefs (18th century)
An Altar, Retable, Tabernacle, 3 Statues, and a Painting (18th century)

Notable people linked to the commune
Roman Caramalli as monk for the Parish from 1999 to 2005 contributed to the recognition of the commune by promoting local culture.

See also
Communes of the Ariège department

References

External links
 Arrien-en-Bethmale on the National Geographic Institute website 
Arrien-en-Bethmale on Géoportail, National Geographic Institute (IGN) website 
Arrieu on the 1750 Cassini Map

Communes of Ariège (department)